The Bond albedo (also called spheric albedo, planetary albedo, and bolometric albedo), named after the American astronomer George Phillips Bond (1825–1865), who originally proposed it, is the fraction of power in the total electromagnetic radiation incident on an astronomical body that is scattered back out into space.

Because the Bond albedo accounts for all of the light scattered from a body at all wavelengths and all phase angles, it is a necessary quantity for determining how much energy a body absorbs.  This, in turn, is crucial for determining the equilibrium temperature of a body.

Because bodies in the outer Solar System are always observed at very low phase angles from the Earth, the only reliable data for measuring their Bond albedo comes from spacecraft.

Phase integral
The Bond albedo (A) is related to the geometric albedo (p) by the expression

where q is termed the phase integral and is given in terms of the directional scattered flux I(α) into phase angle α (averaged over all wavelengths and azimuthal angles) as

The phase angle α is the angle between the source of the radiation (usually the Sun) and the observing direction, and varies from zero for light scattered back towards the source, to 180° for observations looking towards the source. For example, during opposition or looking at the full moon, α is very small, while backlit objects or the new moon have α close to 180°.

Examples
The Bond albedo is a value strictly between 0 and 1, as it includes all possible scattered light (but not radiation from the body itself).  This is in contrast to other definitions of  albedo such as the geometric albedo, which can be above 1. In general, though, the Bond albedo may be greater or smaller than the geometric albedo, depending on the surface and atmospheric properties of the body in question.

Some examples:

See also
 Albedo
 Geometric albedo

References

External links
 discussion of Lunar albedo

Electromagnetic radiation
Astrophysics
Radiometry
Scattering, absorption and radiative transfer (optics)